Saboteur 2 is a mining-themed card game, designed by Frederic Moyersoen and published in 2011 by Z-Man Games.
It is the sequel to Saboteur.

Gameplay
Players are assigned a role out of "Miner", "Saboteur", "Boss", "Profiteer" or "Geologist", and given a mixed hand of path and action cards, and take turns in succession playing one card from their hand (or discarding it) and collecting a new one from the draw pile.

As in the prequel, miners may play a path card in order to progress in building a tunnel from a special card which represents the mine start to one of the three special cards that represent possible gold locations (only one of which is effectively gold, but the players do not know which when the game begins as they are placed face down), while saboteurs try to play path cards which actually hinder such progress (for example by ending paths or making them turn in opposite directions). However, in Saboteur 2 the miners are split into two teams - green and blue - and it is possible for the teams to compete, stopping each other with locked coloured doors. The Boss plays as a miner, but is not prevented by either colour of door from getting to the gold if it is found, and receives less gold for winning. The profiteer always wins, but receives less gold than other winning players. Lastly, the geologist does not care if the gold if found, but is interested in the appearance of crystals within the maze of tunnels.

Like in Saboteur, players can instead play an action card, which have varying effects such as blocking other players from building paths (breaking their tools, in the game's analogy) or unblocking themselves or other players (usually the ones they believe to share the same role of either Miner or Saboteur). They can also peek at each other's roles, change their role or swap cards with another player. Another new addition is the concept of jailing your fellow players. Like the blocking cards, this prevents mining but also ensures that the jailed player will not receive any gold in the end even if his team wins. Players may also play a thief card, allowing them to steal gold from another player at the end of the round, providing the thief is not jailed.

There are three rounds of play, where each round is concluded by either reaching the treasure or running out of action cards.

Setup
The game should be set up where the mine entrance card is separated by seven cards from the middle treasure card, and the other two treasure cards are either above or below separated by one card each. Cards should all be placed vertically. The middle treasure card may optionally be moved a further space away from the mine entrance, by agreement.

Each player receives a random role from the role deck.

Ten cards are removed from the playing deck and each player is then dealt six cards.

Conclusion
A round ends either when a path is established from the start card to the gold card (in which case the miners may win) or there are no more cards in the players' hands and no successful path was established (in which case the victory is awarded to the saboteurs). Players in the victory role(s) are then awarded some gold nuggets. Geologists share the same number of gold pieces as there were crystals showing at the round's end.

A game is composed of three such rounds. At the end of the three rounds, the player with the most gold nuggets wins.

References

External links
 

Card games introduced in 2011
Dedicated deck card games
Connection games